Constant Collet (28 January 1889 – 3 March 1937) was a French racing cyclist. He finished in last place in the 1910 Tour de France.

References

External links
 

1889 births
1937 deaths
French male cyclists
Sportspeople from Ille-et-Vilaine
Cyclists from Brittany